Falfield is a village, located near the northern border of the South Gloucestershire district of Gloucestershire, England on the southern edge of the Berkeley Vale, to the east of the River Severn and just falling into the boundary of the Cotswolds. It is the last parish on the northern boundary of South Gloucestershire. The area has a Wotton-under-Edge (GL12) post code and so is often incorrectly listed as being in the Stroud district of Gloucestershire.
Falfield is one of the longest villages in England, alongside local village Cromhall.

There are approximately 200 houses in the village with a population of some 500, increasing to 762 at the 2011 census.

The nearest town to the village is Thornbury approximately 7 miles to the south. The nearest major cities are Bristol 16 miles to the South and Gloucester 18 miles to the North, and is often referred to as the midpoint between the two.

Falfield is clustered mainly along the A38 road. It is also the first stop from Junction 14 of the M5. The shape of the parish is long in its length and narrow in its width. Both the A38 and M5 run through the village from north to south. It has a large garden centre, and two prisons (Eastwood Park and Leyhill) nearby. The village also includes St George's Church, The Huntsman Inn, a village hall, a small shop, a car dealership and several farms as well as 1st Falfield Scout Association who are celebrating their 40th anniversary in 2013 and 1st Falfield & Stone Brownies part of Girlguiding who are celebrating their 20th anniversary in 2016.

Falfield St George's Church is famous for being the burial place of Conservative politician Sir George Jenkinson, who died in 1892.

Politically, Falfield comes under the constituency of Thornbury & Yate, which is currently a Conservative Party seat held by Luke Hall.

Sport

Falfield was once home to successful cricket and football teams, however both of those have now been discontinued with members now playing at local sides such as Tortworth Musketeers CC. The village is home to 'The Fielders' skittles team. In terms of professional sport, the village is a stronghold for Bristol City F.C. fans due to its South Gloucestershire location, and is an overwhelmingly favoured towards Gloucestershire County Cricket Club, although rugby support tends to be split fairly equally between Gloucester R.F.C. and Bristol R.F.C.

History

A Saxon charter signifies that village was originally an ancient settlement. In 1608 a document "Men & Armour",  compiled by John Smyth (1567–1641), the Steward of the Gloucestershire lands of Lord Berkeley, recorded that the majority of the men in the village were weavers and others being husbandmen (farmers) or tailors. Ecclesiastically the village was part of the Thornbury Parish and was served by a Chapel of Ease, which was recorded as being dilapidated during the 18th century. In 1860 the present St George's Church was built a short distance from where the Chapel of Ease stood. The organist Charles Harford Lloyd served in the village in his youth. Registers containing marriages, baptisms and burials at Falfield Parish Church are in existence from 1860. Prior to this date they are included under Thornbury Parish records.

Anciently a settlement called "Mars" was associated with Falfield. However it has not been determined where this settlement existed, despite research.

A large part of the village is Eastwood Park, anciently a deer park belonging to Thornbury Castle in the 16th century. Later names associated with owners of Eastwood were Tyndale, Ashfield, Rogers, Jenkinson and Watts. More recently it came into the ownership of the Ministry of Defence followed by the Department of Health and is now run as a Conference and Training Centre.

Other older constructions in the village are: Green Farm whose origins are medieval, Heneage Farm - 16th century, Sundayshill Farm probably 17th century, Oakhall Farm, Moorslade Farm where a more modern building has now replaced the older farmhouse mentioned in 16th century documents. Whitfield House and Pool Farm in Whitfield are also worthy of mention. Brinkmarsh Farm, now (quite recently) demolished was a fine Elizabethan building with ball finials. In what is known as Mill Lane is a mill which has been on the present site for four or five hundred years, probably longer.

A women's prison, HM Prison Eastwood Park, is located in the Falfield area.

The village appears to lack a manor house, possibly Heneage Court could have been such, but little of its history is known. Cannonballs found in the roof suggest its existence in the 16th century. Names connected with Heneage Court are: Skey, Hale, Montague Williams and Russell Thomas. Edward Warren laid out the gardens, pleasure grounds and woodland for Russell Thomas in 1913.

References

External links

 Falfield.org.uk

Villages in South Gloucestershire District
Civil parishes in Gloucestershire